Neil French (born 18 July 1964) is a former English cricketer.  French was a right-handed batsman who bowled right-arm medium pace.  He was born in Warsop, Nottinghamshire.

French made his debut for Lincolnshire in the 1988 MCCA Knockout Trophy against Cumberland.  French played Minor counties cricket for Lincolnshire from 1988 to 1995, which included 31 Minor Counties Championship matches and 11 MCCA Knockout Trophy matches.  He made his List A debut against Lancashire in the 1988 NatWest Trophy.  He played 2 further List A matches for Lincolnshire, against Gloucestershire in the 1990 NatWest Trophy and Glamorgan in the 1994 NatWest Trophy.  In his 3 matches, he scored 26 runs at an average of 8.66, with a high score of 18.  With the ball, he took 2 wickets at an expensive bowling average of 80.50, with best figures of 1/56.

His brother, Bruce, played Test cricket for England.

References

External links

1964 births
Living people
People from Warsop
Cricketers from Nottinghamshire
English cricketers
Lincolnshire cricketers